was the thirteenth of the sixty-nine stations of the Nakasendō. It is located in the present-day city of Takasaki, Gunma Prefecture, Japan.

History
Takasaki-shuku was located at the intersection of the Nakasendō and the Mikuni Kaidō. Many buildings and artifacts remain from the Edo period, keeping a lively recreation of the past.

Neighboring post towns
Nakasendō
Kuragano-shuku - Takasaki-shuku - Itahana-shuku
Mikuni Kaidō
Takasaki-shuku (starting location) - Kaneko-shuku

References

Stations of the Nakasendō
Post stations in Gunma Prefecture